Dark Sun is a Dungeons & Dragons campaign setting.

Dark Sun(s) may also refer to:

Anthropology
 Dark Sun (Maya ruler), the nickname of a Maya king of Tikal

Books
 Dark Sun: The Making of the Hydrogen Bomb, a 1995 book by Richard Rhodes
 Dark Sun (novella) a book in the CHERUB series by Robert Muchamore
 Dark Sun Gwyndolin, a fictional character from Dark Souls

Other
 The Dark Sun, a 1990 Italian film
 Dark Suns (film), a 2018 documentary film by Julien Élie
 DarkSun, a Spanish power metal band
 Dark Suns, a German progressive metal band

See also 
 Dark Star (disambiguation)
 Black Sun (disambiguation)
 Black Star (disambiguation)
 The Dark Side of the Sun (disambiguation)